Jacob "Jake" Blankenship (born March 15, 1994) is an American track and field athlete who competes in the pole vault. He placed third at the USA Outdoor Track and Field Championships in 2015.

Blankenship won medals at the World Youth Championships in Athletics in 2011 and NACAC Under-23 Championships in Athletics in 2014. He represents Tennessee Volunteers team collegiately and has had top three finishes both indoors and outdoors in NCAA competition, including winning the 2016 Outdoor Championships.

Career
From Blacklick, Ohio, he attended Gahanna Lincoln High School. While there he established a reputation in the pole vault, setting Ohio state records both indoors and outdoors. He gained the William H. Suddarth Athletic Scholarship for his efforts and reached the podium on his international debut, taking the bronze at the 2011 World Youth Championships in Athletics.

He went on to study at the University of Tennessee in 2012 and began to compete collegiately for their Tennessee Volunteers team. He won the Penn Relays meet, but performed less well at the main championships that year, coming fifth at the SEC event and 15th at the NCAA Men's Outdoor Track and Field Championships.

He made his first podium at the NCAA Outdoor Championships, placing third. He entered the 2014 USA Outdoor Track and Field Championships, but failed to record a valid height. He went unmatched at the 2014 NACAC Under-23 Championships in Athletics, however, easily taking the gold medal some thirty centimeters ahead of compatriot Chase Wolfle.

Heading into his third year for the Tennessee Volunteers, he had runner-up placings at both the SEC and 2015 NCAA Indoor Championships, being beaten at the latter competition only by an American collegiate record performance by Shawnacy Barber. Blankenship improved his best to  – a mark which ranked him in the top ten athletes indoors globally for the season. He matched that best outdoors at the Texas Relays later two weeks later, again losing to Barber. He then had a string of wins, including the Penn Relays and SEC Outdoor Championships (his first conference title). This was streak was broken at the 2015 NCAA Outdoor Championships, where he was some forty centimeters off his best and finished in sixth.

Blankenship established himself at the top national level at the 2015 USA Outdoor Track and Field Championships, taking third place in the open event behind Sam Kendricks and Brad Walker.

Personal bests
Pole vault outdoor –  (2015)
Pole vault indoor –  (2015)

International competitions

References

External links

Living people
1994 births
Sportspeople from Ohio
People from Franklin County, Ohio
American male pole vaulters
Tennessee Volunteers men's track and field athletes
Athletes (track and field) at the 2015 Pan American Games
World Athletics Championships athletes for the United States
Pan American Games medalists in athletics (track and field)
Pan American Games bronze medalists for the United States
Medalists at the 2015 Pan American Games